Symphyglossum sanguineum is a species of flowering plant in the family Orchidaceae.

References 

 Bockemuhl L, Senghas K. (1978) Symphyglossum sanguineum (Rchb. f.) Schltr. 1919. Orchidee 29.

Oncidiinae